Lisnasharragh is one of the ten district electoral areas (DEA) in Belfast, Northern Ireland. The district elects six members to Belfast City Council and contains the wards of Cregagh; Hillfoot; Merok; Orangefield; Ravenhill and Rosetta. Lisnasharragh forms part of the Belfast South and Belfast East constituencies for the Northern Ireland Assembly and UK Parliament.

It was created for the 2014 local elections. The Rosetta ward had previously been part of the Laganbank District Electoral Area, Orangefield and Ravenhill had been part of the Pottinger District Electoral Area, while the remaining wards had been part of the abolished Castlereagh Borough Council.

Councillors

2014 results

References

Electoral wards of Belfast
2014 establishments in Northern Ireland